Miltonville is an unincorporated community in northern Madison Township, Butler County, Ohio, United States. It was founded in 1816 and named after poet John Milton.

References 

Unincorporated communities in Ohio
Unincorporated communities in Butler County, Ohio
Populated places established in 1816
1816 establishments in Ohio